Lowell Richard Bayles (January 24, 1900 - December 5, 1931) was an air race pilot from the "Golden Age of Air Racing."  He was the winner of the 1931 Thompson Trophy flying the Gee Bee Model Z.  He was killed during an attempt at the landplane speed record when the Model Z he was flying crashed at over  mph.

Early life
Bayles was born in Mason, Illinois on January 24, 1900, the oldest child of Hattie  and Rayford E. Bayles.  He graduated from Newton, Illinois High School and attended the University of Illinois in mining engineering, but was forced to leave due to eye trouble.  He was working as an electrician in various mines around Illinois when he began taking flying lessons.

Flying
Bayles began taking flying lessons from a former World War I instructor pilot.  He eventually bought a surplus Curtiss  JN-4 Jenny The Jenny was lost when he stopped over in Herrin, Illinois during a gang war between Charlie Birger and the Shelton Brothers Gang.  Birger had been bombed from the air and he mistook Bayles' plane for the bomber and had the plane dynamited.

After a stint back in the mines, Bayles began barnstorming around the country.  In 1928 he partnered with H. Roscoe Brinton starting a flying service in Springfield, Massachusetts.

Due to the Great Depression, orders for aircraft had stopped and the Granville Brothers Aircraft Company saw the air racing circuit as a way to stay in business. To raise seed money for the air racing operation, the "Springfield Air Racing Association" (SARA) was formed.  A group of local Springfield merchants and businessmen who sought to promote Springfield bought shares to fund creation of the racing planes.  Bayles added $500 of his own money to be the pilot in the venture.

Bayles flew the Gee Bee Model X in the Cirrus Derby in 1930, coming in second and sharing the $7000 purse with the Granvilles.

In 1931, Bayles piloted a Gee Bee Model E Sportster in the Ford National Reliability Air Tour, coming in fourth in the point standing and winning the Great Lakes Trophy for a total of $2000 in prize money.

Speed record and death
Bayles had failed to break the official 3 km World Landplane Speed Record at the 1931 National Air Races. Following the Thompson Trophy race, the Gee Bee Z was re-engined with a larger,  Wasp Senior radial, in preparation for an attempt at establishing another world speed record at Wayne County Airport in Detroit, Michigan.

The plane crashed alongside a railroad track in a huge ball of flame and smoke. Lowell Bayles' body was thrown  from the disintegrated plane.

Analysis of the crash, based on motion picture film of the event examined frame-by-frame, showed that the aircraft's fuel cap had come loose and crashed through the Gee Bee Z's windscreen. It struck the pilot and incapacitated him, causing a sudden upset in pitch that led to the structural failure of the wing. In addition, tests of a reproduction aircraft have shown that the Gee Bee Z was susceptible to aerodynamic flutter at high speed.

His fiancée, Gertrude St. Marie of Springfield, traveled to his hometown of Mason, Illinois for his funeral, along with Mrs. Zantford Granville.

References

External links
 

1900 births
1931 deaths
American air racers
American aviation record holders
Aviators killed in aviation accidents or incidents in the United States
Flight speed record holders
Ford National Reliability Air Tour
People from Effingham County, Illinois
Victims of aviation accidents or incidents in 1931